Norman D. Brannon (born April 22, 1961) is an American politician. He is a former member of the South Carolina House of Representatives from the 38th District, serving from 2012 until 2017. He is a member of the Republican party.

References

Living people
1961 births
Republican Party members of the South Carolina House of Representatives
Politicians from Detroit
21st-century American politicians